The Southamerican Tour 2019 was a concert tour by American rock musician Frank Iero (on his project Frank Iero and the Future Violents) through South America and Mexico, originally planned for April and May, 2019. It was a promotional tour for Iero's third studio album, Barriers, released on May 31; it had performances in Peru, Chile, Argentina and Brazil; then, a three-date leg in Mexico was added, which was postponed to September due to health reasons.

After these performances, Iero did a North American Tour.

Announcement and scheduling 
On January 22, 2019, Frank Iero along with some press announced his South American tour, which by then included shows in only three countries: Peru, Chile and Brazil.

On January 31, given the high demand and after 2 advance-ticket stages (out of 3) selling out, it was announced that venue in Santiago de Chile would change from Club Subterráneo to Club Chocolate; the latter had the benefit of being all ages, too.

On February 28, Iero stated that after the performances in South America he would do shows in Mexico City and Monterrey, as well as adding a date in Buenos Aires, Argentina. Finally, a show in Guadalajara, Mexico was scheduled.

Postponement of Mexico leg 
Due to a health issue while in South America, Iero had to postpone the Mexican leg.

Once in the US, during a livestream for Loudwire on May 8, he claimed to be still "dealing with this Brazilian case". Guitarist Evan Nestor said, while reading some questions: "This is a good one: When are you coming to Mexico?", to which Iero replied:

Tour dates

References 

2019 concert tours